Lloyd Hopkins Field is a baseball stadium in Alton, Illinois. Owned and operated by the city of Alton, it is the home field for the Alton River Dragons, a collegiate summer baseball team in the Prospect League, and for American Legion Baseball. Hopkins Field hosted American Legion teams from 1981 to 2015, and they returned in 2020. Hopkins Field was also the home of the Bluff City Bombers in the Central Illinois Collegiate League from 1998 to 2004.

In January 2020 the city of Alton signed a 10-year lease with the River Dragons. The deal called for upgrades to Hopkins Field, including the addition of a locker room, batting cages, a new scoreboard and video board, concession amenities, and seating for 1,800 people. Hopkins Field had been renovated in 2015 with redone dugouts and new batting cages, lights, siding, netting, fencing, and turf.

References

External links
 Prospect League
 Alton River Dragons

Baseball venues in Illinois
Buildings and structures in Madison County, Illinois